Dmitri Valerievich Tertyshny (December 26, 1976 – July 23, 1999) was a Russian professional ice hockey defenceman who played one season in the National Hockey League (NHL) for the Philadelphia Flyers and four seasons in Russia for Traktor Chelyabinsk.

Playing career
After spending a year with Traktor Chelyabinsk of the CIS/Russian League, Tertyshny was selected in the sixth round with the Flyers' #132 overall draft pick in the 1995 NHL Entry Draft. He spent three more seasons with Chelyabinsk before joining the Philadelphia Flyers in the 1998–99 season.

Fatal accident
On July 23, 1999, during the offseason after his rookie NHL campaign, Tertyshny was on a boating trip to Okanagan Lake in British Columbia with two players from the Flyers' minor-league affiliate Philadelphia Phantoms, Francis Belanger and Mikhail Chernov, when he suffered fatal injuries in a freak accident. Tertyshny fell forward out of the boat after it hit a wave, the boat ran over him, and its propeller slashed his neck and his jugular vein.

Career statistics

See also
List of ice hockey players who died during their playing career

References

External links
 

1976 births
1999 deaths
Accidental deaths in British Columbia
Sportspeople from Chelyabinsk
Philadelphia Flyers draft picks
Philadelphia Flyers players
Russian ice hockey defencemen
Traktor Chelyabinsk players
Boating accident deaths